The Convention of 1832 was the first political gathering of colonists in Mexican Texas.

On August 22, the ayuntiamento (city council) at San Felipe de Austin (the capital of Austin's colony) called for each district to elect five delegates.   Sixteen communities chose delegates. The two municipalities with the largest Tejano population, San Antonio de Béxar and Victoria, refused to participate.  The majority of the elected delegates were known as relatively even-tempered.  Many known agitators, such as James Bowie and William B. Travis, were defeated.   Tejanos did not have a large presence at the convention, largely due to the boycott by the Béxar and Victoria municipalities.  Convention organizers invited several prominent Tejanos from these towns to attend, but all declined.

On October 1, 1832, 55 delegates met in San Felipe de Austin; attendance may have been diminished due to the short notice.  
Over the next six days, the delegates adopted a series of resolutions requesting changes in the governance of Texas.  Historian Eugene Campbell Barker suggests that the discussions would likely not have concluded so swiftly unless the delegates had done "considerable preparation before the meeting".

After approving the list of resolutions, delegates created a 7-member central committee to convene future meetings.  The central committee would be based in San Felipe "for the purpose of circulating information of events of importance to the interest of the people".

The convention adjourned on October 6 after unanimously electing William H. Wharton to deliver the resolutions to the state legislature in Saltillo and to the Mexican Congress in Mexico City.  Just before the group dispersed, Rafael Manchola, the alcalde (mayor) of Goliad, arrived.  He was the only delegate from Goliad and the only Tejano to appear at the convention.  Manchola volunteered to accompany Wharton at his own expense—he and other delegates thought the expedition might have more success if a Tejano was also involved.  Days later, Austin wrote that "we have just had a convention of all Texas, native Mexicans and foreign settlers – all united as one man".

Committees
Appeal of immigration ban (Immigration)
Reduction of tariffs (Tariffs)
Land business east of San Jacinto (Land business)
Indian affairs (Native land claims)
Regulate Customs affairs while no inspector (Customs)
Schools
Independent statehood (Statehood)
Organize militia (Militia)
English as a second language (English)
Central Committee proposal
Appoint a surveyor-general for Texas

Delegates

Notes

References

Sources
 originally published 1926 by Lamar & Barton
 originally published 2004 by New York: Free Press

.  digital images courtesy of Denton, TX: University of North Texas Libraries, The Portal to Texas History.

Convention of 1832 delegates